Syngrapha parilis is a species of looper moth in the family Noctuidae. It is found in North America and Europe.

The MONA or Hodges number for Syngrapha parilis is 8948.

References

Further reading

External links

 

Plusiini
Articles created by Qbugbot
Moths described in 1809